Brenner is an old lunar impact crater that lies in the rugged southeastern part of the Moon's near side. It is named after the Serbian-Austrian astronomer Spiridon Gopčević (who was also a publicist under the pen name of Leo Brenner). It is located within one crater diameter northwest of the crater pair Metius and Fabricius.

This ancient formation has been deeply eroded by subsequent impacts, to the point where only the western part still resembles a crater. That face has the most intact part of the rim, although it has been worn down until it forms a low ridge in the surface. The northeast part of the crater has been reshaped until it is little more than a rough, irregular part of the terrain. The southeastern rim is overlain by a relatively old crater designated Brenner A.

Satellite craters

By convention these features are identified on lunar maps by placing the letter on the side of the crater midpoint that is closest to Brenner.

References

 
 
 
 
 
 
 
 
 
 
 

Impact craters on the Moon